Heinrich Wilhelm Ernst (8 June 18128 October 1865) was a Moravian-Jewish violinist, violist and composer. He was seen as the outstanding violinist of his time and one of Niccolò Paganini's greatest successors. He contributed to polyphonic playing and discovered new ways to compose polyphonic violin music. His most famous, and technically difficult, compositions include the sixth of his Polyphonic Studies "Die letzte Rose", and Grand Caprice on Schubert's "Erlkönig".

Biography
Ernst was born in Brno, Moravia on 8 June 1812. He began playing violin at the age of 9, and attended the Vienna Conservatory of the Gesellschaft der Musikfreunde from 1825, studying violin under Joseph Böhm and Joseph Mayseder, and composition under Ignaz von Seyfried.

In 1828, Niccolò Paganini visited Vienna. Ernst heard him and was deeply impressed by his violin playing. It's said that Ernst then played for Paganini who predicted a brilliant career for him. Paganini gave 14 concerts in Vienna, and Ernst attended many of these to observe the master. In April 1829, Ernst left Vienna for Munich for an employment in the royal orchestra, but Paganini advised him to aim for something higher. After that, Ernst played concerts in the same cities as Paganini. These concerts were appreciated, but he still stood in Paganini's shadow. This depressed him to the degree that he locked himself into his room for five days. Later in Frankfurt in the spring of 1830, Ernst met Paganini again. There, Ernst gave a concert where he played Paganini's Nel cor pìù non mi sento with an accuracy that stunned both the audience and Paganini himself. This work, as with most of Paganini's compositions, was unpublished at that time, which meant that Ernst must have learned it by ear at Paganini's concerts. Some days after, Ernst visited Paganini, who was sitting composing on his guitar. Paganini immediately rose up, threw the manuscript under the bed sheet, and said that he had to protect his composition not only from Ernst's ears, but also his eyes.

In the following years, Ernst made several tours through France. When he heard that Paganini was to play concerts in Marseille in January 1837, he went there to hear his master again. Ernst was determined to learn the secrets of Paganini's complex technique. With help from relatives of his secretary, he rented a room next to Paganini's. He hid there day and night, listening to Paganini rehearse and writing down what he heard. That must have been difficult, because Paganini did not practice much during his tours, and when he did, he used a mute. Ernst also managed, secretly, to attend all of Paganini's rehearsals in Marseille in pursuit of his goal. He too played concerts in Marseille and managed to get these and the concerts Paganini played to become some sort of competition between the two. He tried to organize two concerts before Paganini arrived, and these concerts were well appreciated by the audience. Then, when Paganini was about to play his first concert, the demands on him were greater because of the comparison to Ernst's playing. Paganini couldn't meet the demands of the audience who thought that Ernst's playing had spoken more to the heart. Paganini then organized another concert and challenged the audience by playing his Moïses, variations on the G string, moving some to tears. After that concert, opinions were divided. Some said Paganini mastered the difficulties better, but Ernst played with more sentiment. Ernst learned this composition through the wall from his room next to Paganini.

Perhaps out of respect for Paganini, Ernst later composed his own set of variations on the theme Carnaval de Venise, which he often played at the end of his concert. He also used scordatura in the same manner as Paganini's variations. This piece was popular among Ernst's audiences, and became his signature.

Ernst also played the viola. He performed the viola solo of Berlioz's Harold en Italie many times, including under the direction of the composer in 1842.

Ernst moved to England in 1844, where joined London's Beethoven Quartet Society and played Beethoven String quartets with Joseph Joachim, Henryk Wieniawski and Carlo Alfredo Piatti. He spent the last seven years of his life in Nice, composing works including Polyphonic Studies, Othello-Fantasie and Concerto pathétique.

Severe neuralgia in 1862 left Ernst unable to play. He died in Nice on 8 October 1865.

Compositions 
{| class="wikitable sortable"
|+
!Op.
!Title
!Scoring
!
|-
| 10 || Elégie (sur la mort d'un objet chéri) ||  violin, orchestra || Vienna, 1840 (also violin, piano)
|-
| 11 || Fantaisie brillante … sur Otello de Rossini ||  violin, orchestra || Mainz, 1839 
|-
| 12 || Concertino in D major ||  violin, orchestra || Brunswick, 1839 
|-
| 13 || Adagio sentimental, Rondino ||  violin, orchestra || Brunswick, 1841
|-
| 16 || Boléro ||  violin, orchestra || Hamburg, 1843 
|-
| 17 || Polonaise in D major ||  violin, orchestra || Hamburg, 1842 
|-
| 18 || Variations sur l'air national hollandais ||  violin, orchestra || Vienna,  
|-
| 18 || Le carnaval de Venise (Variations burlesques sur la canzonetta "Cara mia mamma") ||  violin, orchestra || Leipzig, 1844 
|-
| 19 || Introduction, caprice et finale sur … Il pirata de Bellini ||  violin, orchestra || London, 1845 
|-
| 21 || Rondo Papageno ||  violin, orchestra || London, 1846 
|-
| 22 || Airs hongrois variés ||  violin, orchestra || London, 
|-
| 23 || Concerto pathétique in F minor||  violin, orchestra || Leipzig, 1851 
|-
| 26 || Grand Caprice on Schubert's "Erlkönig" || solo violin || Hamburg, 1854
|-
| || Pensées fugitives (Les gages d'amitié) || violin, piano || London, 1843 (collab. S. Heller)
|-
| || Feuillet d'album || violin, piano || London, 1844
|-
| || Variations on 'I tuoi frequenti palpiti''' || violin, piano || London, no date (collab. G. Osborne)
|-
| || 6 Polyphonic Studies || solo violin || Hamburg, 1865
|}

Notes

References

 

Sources
 Fan Elun, The life and works of Heinrich Wilhelm Ernst (1814–1865) with emphasis on his reception as violinist and composer, (Cornell University 1993).
 Amely Heller, H. W. Ernst – As Seen By His Contemporaries Linthicum Heights, Maryland 1986.
 J. Pěčka, Heinrich Wilhelm Ernst. Paganini z Brna (Brno, Archív města Brna, 2007). .
 Mark W. Rowe, Heinrich Wilhelm Ernst: Virtuoso violinist'' Ashgate Publishing, England 2008.

External links

1812 births
1865 deaths
Musicians from Brno
People from the Margraviate of Moravia
19th-century classical composers
19th-century Austrian musicians
Austrian male classical composers
Austrian classical violinists
Austrian classical violists
Jewish classical violinists
Austrian Romantic composers
19th-century classical violinists
Male classical violinists
19th-century Austrian male musicians
Moravian Jews
20th-century violists